Failure is not meeting a desirable or intended objective.

Failure may also refer to:

Art and entertainment

Music
Failure (King Missile album), 1998
Failure (The Posies album), 1988
Failure (Assemblage 23 album), 2001
Failure (Outbreak album), 2006
Failure (band), a 1990s rock band
"Failure", a 2001 song by Kings of Convenience from Quiet Is the New Loud
"Failure" (Sevendust song), a 2006 song by the alternative metal band Sevendust
"Failure", a 2011 song by Juliana Hatfield from the album There's Always Another Girl
"Failure", a 2013 song by Red Fang from the album Whales and Leeches
"Failure" (Breaking Benjamin song), a 2015 song by the rock band Breaking Benjamin
Failure, a 2017 song by NEFFEX

Other media
Failure Magazine, a magazine started in 2000
The Failure (1915 film), a silent American film 
The Failure (1917 film), a silent British film

Other uses 
Structural failure, a material stressed to its strength limit
In pattern matching, failure is when a (sub)pattern does not match a string
Failure rate
Market failure

See also
 Failer, a 2003 album by Kathleen Edwards
 Fail (disambiguation)